Zachary Joseph Horwitz known professionally as Zach Avery, is an American convicted felon and former actor. In 2021, he was arrested on charges of defrauding investors of $227 million through a Ponzi scheme. He pled guilty to securities fraud and was sentenced to twenty years in prison on February 14, 2022.

Career 
Avery's screen debut was in the 2009 film G.E.D. In 2014, he appeared in an uncredited role as an SS medic in Fury. In 2018, Avery starred in Hell Is Where the Home Is (also known as Trespassers), as well as appeared in a small role in the Rudolf Nureyev biopic The White Crow. In 2020, he appeared in Last Moment of Clarity.

Avery was a co-founder along with Hallivis brothers in creation of 1inMM Productions company in 2013 which purported to produce, acquire, and distribute content to mainstream audiences. However, upon pleading guilty to securities fraud, Avery admitted that no distribution rights had been secured, and that he had forged distribution contracts.

Fraud conviction 
Avery was arrested on charges of wire fraud (18 U.S.C. § 1343) on April 5, 2021, in connection with the alleged orchestration of a $690 million Ponzi scheme that began in 2015, defrauding investors of over $227 million based on false claims that investor money would be used to acquire licensing rights to films HBO and Netflix had agreed to distribute abroad, particularly in Latin America. On October 4, 2021, Avery pleaded guilty to one count of securities fraud. On February 14, 2022, Avery was sentenced to 20 years in federal prison and ordered to pay $230 million in restitution.

Personal life 
On the same day of his arrest, his then-wife, Mallory Hagedorn, petitioned for divorce.

Portrayals

Real-life documentaries featuring Avery include:

References

External links 

Zach Avery interview by Pop-Culturalist

Living people
People from Berkeley, California
21st-century American male actors
American criminals
American male criminals
American male film actors
American people convicted of fraud
Jewish American male actors
Male actors from California
Pyramid and Ponzi schemes
Year of birth missing (living people)